Royal Gunpowder Mills may refer to:

 Ballincollig Royal Gunpowder Mills
 Faversham, Kent explosive industry
 Waltham Abbey Royal Gunpowder Mills